The 1953 ICF Canoe Slalom World Championships were held in Meran, Italy under the auspices of International Canoe Federation. It was the 3rd edition.

Medal summary

Men's

Canoe

Kayak

Women's

Kayak

Medals table

References
Results
International Canoe Federation

1953 in Italian sport
ICF Canoe Slalom World Championships
International sports competitions hosted by Italy
Icf Canoe Slalom World Championships, 1953
Canoeing and kayaking competitions in Italy